Mihai Datcu from the German Aerospace Center, Oberpfaffenhofen / Germany, Wessling, Germany was named Fellow of the Institute of Electrical and Electronics Engineers (IEEE) in 2013 for contributions to information mining of high resolution synthetic aperature radar and optical earth observation images.

References 

Fellow Members of the IEEE
Living people
Year of birth missing (living people)
Place of birth missing (living people)